Béka Melayu, Cakap Melayu, Lidah Melayu or Tuturan Melayu is a linguistic purism of Malay (and Indonesian) language based on the Austronesian language group, especially the Malayic branches. This project is newly created by native cyberspace users on the Internet. It is also less known as Melayu jati or Melayu tulen which means "pure Malay". Among the most significant foreign contributors to Malay vocabulary are Sanskrit, Arabic, Persian, Hindi, Siamese, Tamil, English, Portuguese, Chinese and Japanese, while Dutch is most spotted in Indonesian.

Etymology
Beka and cakap can be defined as 'discussing', 'talk' or 'speak', while lidah means 'tongue'. Beka was chosen to replace the word bahasa, 'language' which is believed to be derived from the Sanskrit . It is also suggested to come from Malay , 'to accelerate' which refers to a river that was mentioned in the Malay Annals. However, this term is assumed to be related to the word layar or melayar, which means 'sailing', descended from Proto-Austronesian *layaʀ. So, Beka Melayu literally means 'Malay discussion' or 'Malay language'.

Simple history and conception

In earlier times, since the colonial period, the concept of linguistic purism in Malay was not widely known or supported. Writers who focused on translating foreign books tried to block most western influences like English and Dutch in Malay literature, while other influences such as Sanskrit and Arabic were still widely used. 

Pure Malay was first suggested in 2017 under the name Lidah Malayaw. The effort was then followed by other cyberusers using sites like Facebook, YouTube, Quora, and most recently Twitter.

Concept 
The objective of Beka Melayu is to remove all foreign vocabulary in the Malay language and to use native language innovations. This new language variation accepts all of the pure Austronesian elements, mostly from the Malayic language; for example, Malay itself, Minangkabau, Iban, Temuan, Jakun, Javanese and many more. The Austroasiatic elements already used will be kept.

Methods
There are several methods used in Beka Melayu to create new vocabulary. Some examples of the methods are:

Main Malay adaption 
This method uses pure Malay words already recorded in several Malay dictionaries or other references. Among the commonly used dictionaries are Kamus Dewan (KD), Kamus Besar Bahasa Indonesia (KBBI), Wilkinson dictionary (can be accessed via SEALang Library Malay) and others. For example:

Dialect Malay and Malayic adaption 
Based on pure words in dialectal Malay like Kelantan-Pattani, Terengganu, Kedah, Pahang, Johor-Riau, Sarawak and others, and Malayic languages such as Iban, Minangkabau, Banjar, Jakun, Temuan and many more. For example:

Austronesian innovation 
Based on words from other Austronesian languages like Javanese, Sundanese, Tagalog, Maori and others. Some of the words are changed to adapt to Malay (Johor-Riau) grammar and pronunciation. For example:

New word creation 
New words and terms can be created by several methods based on Malay grammar like affix addition, reduplication and metathesis, while a phrase with two or three words is often shortened by blending. For example:
By affixes addition (common method)
 jemadi: from  'to be' + -em- (infix), for 'creation, being'; cf. Javanese .

By reduplication
Indonesian , 'suffocating substances'.

By word blending

, 'cinema'.

Sentence 

Kepersenangan, Awang panggilanku.
(Hello, my name is Awang.)

Dua puluh telu tahun tuaku.
(My age is twenty three years old.)

Akan mengaji anak empunya warung itu kajibintang di Atélua.
(That shop owner's child will study astronomy at New Zealand.)

Berterima kasih empu sakit tuan itu ke Tuhan atas diberikan dia pasangan yang sangat santun.
(The androgologist was grateful to God because he was blessed with a very civilised partner.)

Kebenarannya sangat tinggi bayaran hidup di pangkalan ini untuk inak segalur itu.
(The cost living at that city is in fact too expensive for that aunt and her family.)

Notes

References

See also
 List of loanwords in Malay
 List of loanwords in Indonesian
 Abdullah Abdul Kadir
 Zainal Abidin Ahmad (writer)

External links 
Useful phrases in Beka Melayu
Beka Melayu database - wordlist comparison 
Beka Melayu database - colour comparison

Linguistic purism